Baptist Institute for Christian Workers (also known as Crown Nursing Home and now known as Snyder House) is a historic building 1425-1429 Snyder Avenue in Philadelphia, Pennsylvania, which has been used for several purposes and currently is a rehabilitation facility for veterans.

The unique late-Gothic Revival (Institutional Gothic) and Jacobean style building was constructed between 1911 and 1929 by Benjamin Rush Stevens for use as home to the Baptist Institute, a junior college, which later moved to Bryn Mawr and became known as Ellen Cushing Junior College. In 1952 the Navy started using the building, and in 1958 the building began use as a nursing home known as Crown Nursing Home and then later the Cambridge Retirement Community. The building was added to the National Register of Historic Places in 1983. The building was renovated in 2013 and currently is used by the Veterans' Administration at a  40-bed facility known as Snyder House for veterans recovering from homelessness and addictions.

References

Churches on the National Register of Historic Places in Pennsylvania
Gothic Revival architecture in Pennsylvania
Religious buildings and structures completed in 1911
Churches in Philadelphia
Nursing homes in the United States
South Philadelphia
National Register of Historic Places in Philadelphia
Veterans Affairs medical facilities